The Swedish Evangelical Lutheran Church is a historic property in Anoka County, Minnesota. It is located at 2332 Swedish Drive in  Ham Lake, Minnesota. The Late Victorian style church was built in 1872 to the design of architect Per August Gustafson. The church is listed on the National Register of Historic Places. The church is owned and maintained by the congregation of Our Savior's Lutheran Church of East Bethel, Minnesota and is also known as Our Saviors Lutheran Church of Ham Lake. Both churches are affiliated with the Evangelical Lutheran Church in America.

History 
The following is the text of a plaque hanging on the front of the church.  It was placed there as part of an Eagle Scout project in the spring of 2005. It provides an accurate portrayal of the history of the church which was collected from personal accounts and the Anoka County historical records.

In 1964, the church's congregation moved to another facility however the church is used for worship purposes at various times of the year. The congregation now refers to the chapel Our Savior's Chapel.

References

External links

Our Saviors Lutheran Church website

Lutheran churches in Minnesota
Churches on the National Register of Historic Places in Minnesota
19th-century Lutheran churches in the United States
Swedish-American culture in Minnesota
Victorian architecture in Minnesota
Churches completed in 1872
National Register of Historic Places in Anoka County, Minnesota
1872 establishments in Minnesota